Gemixystus rhodanos is a species of sea snail, a marine gastropod mollusk in the family Muricidae, the murex snails or rock snails.

Description

Distribution
This marine species occurs off Queensland, Australia.

References

 Bouchet, P.; Fontaine, B. (2009). List of new marine species described between 2002-2006. Census of Marine Life.

External links
Houart R. (2004). A review of Gemixystus Iredale, 1929 (Gastropoda: Muricidae) from Australia and New Zealand. Novapex. 5 (Hors-série 2): 1-27

Gastropods described in 2004
Gemixystus